Nicola Brown(e) may refer to:
Nicola Brown or Bupsi, singer from British series The X Factor
Nicola Brown, candidate in Wandsworth London Borough Council election, 2006
Nicola Browne (born 1983) New Zealand cricketer

See also
Nicole Brown Simpson (1959–1994), German-American murder victim and ex-wife of American football player O. J. Simpson